Anton Barticevic (born 2 May 1906, date of death unknown) was a Chilean athlete. He competed in the men's hammer throw at the 1936 Summer Olympics.

References

1902 births
Year of death missing
Athletes (track and field) at the 1936 Summer Olympics
Chilean male hammer throwers
Olympic athletes of Chile
Place of birth missing